Atlin Airport  is located  northeast of Atlin, British Columbia, Canada.

The airport is classified as an airport of entry by Nav Canada. Due to the remote location of Atlin, the Atlin Royal Canadian Mounted Police (RCMP) detachment performs customs clearance (as per Section 2(1) of the Customs Act) on behalf of the Canada Border Services Agency on a call-out basis. RCMP officers at Atlin Airport can handle general aviation aircraft only, with no more than 15 passengers aboard.

See also
Atlin Water Aerodrome

References

External links
Page about this airport on COPA's Places to Fly airport directory

Registered aerodromes in British Columbia
Atlin District